Xindian station may refer to:

 Xindian metro station, a metro station in Taipei, Taiwan
 Xindian station (Hohhot Metro), a metro station in Hohhot, China